Épinay - Villetaneuse is a railway station located in the commune of Épinay-sur-Seine, Seine-Saint-Denis department, France. It is also adjacent to the communes of Montmagny and Deuil-la-Barre in Val d'Oise.

Despite its name, the Gare d'Épinay-Villetaneuse is located approximately 1 km from Villetaneuse. Nonetheless, it is the closest station to the Paris 13 University campus in Villetaneuse.

The station is at the junction of two lines:
 Paris - Persan - Beauvais - Le Tréport-Mers
 Paris - Ermont - Pontoise

It is at the 9.040 kilometre point on the Saint-Denis - Pontoise line, an older section of the Paris - Lille route which was superseded in 1859 by the more direct line from Saint-Denis to Creil. There was previously a military connection between this line and the Grande Ceinture line. The SA HLM SICF-La Sablière, a public housing subsidiary of the SNCF, has requisitioned the land and built housing blocks. In 2000, the number of passengers per day was between 7,500 and 15,000. The station has two free carparks with 100 and 177 spaces.

History

Although the stop appears to have been created in 1850, the station was constructed only in 1880, as the Gare d'Épinay, by the Chemins de fer du Nord with appropriate architecture for a junction station, as at Eu. It was renamed Gare d'Épinay-Villetaneuse in 1908 when the new Gare d'Épinay-sur-Seine was built on what was then called the Les Grésillons line (now incorporated into the North Branch of the RER C).

The Nord Company opened the line between Épinay and Persan-Beaumont via Montsoult in 1877 and the Montsoult - Luzarches branch in 1880.

The Grande Ceinture line had its own station in the same location as that of the Nord Company. This very soon fell into disuse, since it was occupied by the station café at the beginning of the 20th century, and it became completely unnecessary to the railway when passenger traffic on the Grande Ceinture was terminated in 1939. It was demolished in the 1990s.

Today

The Persan-Beaumont line and the Valmondois line separate immediately after the station building. The station is served by Transilien trains on the H line.

In approximately 2014, the station is to be connected to the North Tangent.

References

External links

 

Railway stations in Seine-Saint-Denis
Railway stations in France opened in 1880